Anthidium dalmaticum is a species of bee in the family Megachilidae, the leaf-cutter, carder, or mason bees.

Distribution
It is known from Croatia and Greece.

References

dalmaticum
Insects described in 1884
Taxa named by Alexander Mocsáry